Tripidium arundinaceum, synonym Saccharum arundinaceum, commonly known as  hardy sugar cane, is a grass native to tropical and subtropical Asia from India to Korea and New Guinea.

In the Tamil language it is known as நாணல் − nāṇal. In the Assamese language it is known as মেগেলা কুঁহিয়াৰ − meghela kuhiyaar, with the word kuhiyaar meaning sugarcane.

References

Andropogoneae
Flora of Asia